Express Train of Love (German:Blitzzug der Liebe) is a 1925 German silent comedy film directed by Johannes Guter and starring Ossi Oswalda, Willy Fritsch and Lillian Hall-Davis. It premiered on 6 May 1925 at the Ufa-Palast am Zoo in Berlin.

The film's art direction was by Rudi Feld.

Cast
 Ossi Oswalda as Kitty 
 Willy Fritsch as Charley 
 Lillian Hall-Davis as Lissi 
 Nigel Barrie as Fred 
 Jenny Jugo as Sportslady 
 Ernst Hofmann as Redakteur 
 Josefine Dora   
 Karl Platen   
 Werner Westerholt   
 Henry Bender   
 Georg John  
 Hans Junkermann   
 Hans Oberländer   
 Philipp Manning

References

Bibliography
 Hardt, Ursula. From Caligari to California: Erich Pommer's life in the International Film Wars. Berghahn Books, 1996.
 Kreimeier, Klaus. The Ufa Story: A History of Germany's Greatest Film Company, 1918-1945. University of California Press, 1999.

External links

1925 films
1925 comedy films
Films of the Weimar Republic
German silent feature films
German comedy films
Films directed by Johannes Guter
Films based on short fiction
Films based on works by Karl Hans Strobl
Films produced by Erich Pommer
German black-and-white films
Silent comedy films
1920s German films
1920s German-language films